Anthony James Dean (born 19 January 1954) is a former Australian politician.

Born in Nannup, Western Australia, Dean received a Bachelor of Science (Agriculture) and a Diploma of Education, becoming a schoolteacher. He was elected to the Western Australian Legislative Assembly in 2001 as the Labor member for Bunbury, defeating sitting member Ian Osborne. He was himself defeated in 2005 by John Castrilli. Dean has continued his political career and currently holds the position of shire president for the Shire of Nannup.

References

1954 births
Living people
Members of the Western Australian Legislative Assembly
Australian Labor Party members of the Parliament of Western Australia
21st-century Australian politicians